A wedding breakfast is a feast given to the newlyweds and guests after the wedding, making it equivalent to a wedding reception that serves a meal. The phrase is still used in British English.

Nowadays the wedding breakfast is not normally a morning meal, nor does it look like a typical breakfast, so its name can be confusing.

Origin of the name

The name is claimed to have arisen from the fact that in pre-Reformation times, the wedding service was usually a Eucharistic Mass and that the newlyweds would therefore have been fasting before the wedding in order to be eligible to receive the sacrament of Holy Communion. After the wedding ceremony was complete, the priest would bless and distribute some wine, cakes, and sweetmeats, which were then handed round to the company, including the newlyweds. This distribution of food and drink was therefore a literal "break fast" for the newly married couple, though others in attendance would not necessarily take Communion and therefore would not necessarily have been fasting. Since usage of the phrase cannot be shown to date back earlier than the first half of the 19th century however, a pre-16th-century origin seems unlikely.

The author of Party-giving on Every Scale (London, 1880) suggests the phrase may have evolved fifty years earlier:

The Oxford English Dictionary does not record any occurrences of the phrase "wedding breakfast" before 1850, but it was used at least as far back as 1838. This would agree with the quotation above, which suggests the phrase came into use about the 1830s.

Current use
The Compact Oxford Dictionary lists the phrase as only "British", and the Merriam-Webster online dictionary does not list it at all.

The custom of the wedding breakfast is occasionally spotted in non-English-speaking countries that market themselves as wedding destinations, e.g. Poland.

See also
 List of breakfast topics
 Wedding
 Wedding reception
 Rehearsal dinner

Notes

References

Wedding traditions
Breakfast